Eupithecia attali is a moth in the  family Geometridae. It is found in Ecuador.

References

Moths described in 1993
attali
Moths of South America